Benard or Bénard is a surname or given name. Notable people with the name include:

Surname
 Abraham-Joseph Bénard (1750–1822), French actor of the Comédie-Française
 Aimé Bénard (1873–1938), Canadian politician
 Alexander Benard, American businessman
 André Bénard (1922–2016), French industrialist
 Anne-José Madeleine Henriette Bénard (1928–2010), better known as Cécile Aubry, French actress
 Catherine Éléonore Bénard (1740–1769), French lady-in-waiting
 Cheryl Benard (born 1953), American academic
 Chris Benard (born 1990), American track and field athlete
 Claude Bénard (born 1926), French athlete
 Dominique Bénard, French Deputy Secretary-General of the World Organization of the Scout Movement
 Émile Bénard (1844–1929), French architect and painter
 Henri Bénard (1874–1939), French physicist, best known for his research on convection
 Laurent Bénard (1573–1620), French chief founder of the Maurist Congregation
 Marcos Abel Flores Benard (born 1985), Argentine footballer
 Marcus Benard (born 1985), American football linebacker
 Marvin Benard (born 1970), Major League Baseball outfielder, batting and throwing left-handed
 Maurice Benard (born 1963), American actor
 Michel Bénard (born c. 1713), councillor of the Conseil Supérieur of New France
 Paulo Bénard Guedes (1892–1960), Governor-General of Portuguese India
 Pierre Bénard (1898–1946), French journalist
 Raoul Bénard (1881–1961), French sculptor
 Raymond Benard, stage name of Ray "Crash" Corrigan (1902–1976), American actor

Given name
 Benard E. Aigbokhan (born 1951), Nigerian academic
 Olumuyiwa Benard Aliu (born 1960), Nigerian President of the Council of the International Civil Aviation Organization
 Benard Ighner (1945–2017), American jazz musician
 Benard Keter (born 1992), American athlete
 Benard Kimeli (born 1995), Kenyan long-distance runner
 Benard Kipkorir Ngeno (born 1996), Kenyan long-distance runner
 Benard Nkanjo (born 1970), Zimbabwean sculptor
 Jean-Baptiste Bénard de la Harpe (1683–1765), French explorer
 Benard Kwaku Mensah (born 1924), Ghanaian politician
 Benard Otieno Okoth, Kenyan politician

See also
 Bernard
 Besnard